Calvin Earl Howe (November 27, 1924 – May 5, 2008) was an American professional baseball player who appeared in one game in Major League Baseball as a relief pitcher for the Chicago Cubs during the  season. He was born in Rock Falls, Illinois. 
 
In his one relief appearance, on September 26, 1952, against the St. Louis Cardinals at Sportsman's Park, Howe posted a perfect 0.00 ERA without a decision or save, giving up one walk (to Solly Hemus), while striking out two (Dick Sisler and Gerry Staley) in two hitless innings of work.

Howe's minor league career lasted for eleven seasons (1942; 1948–1957); he won 99 games (losing 70) and posted a 3.49 ERA in 1,337 innings pitched.

See also
1952 Chicago Cubs season
Cup of coffee

References

External links
Baseball Reference
Retrosheet

1924 births
2008 deaths
Baseball players from Illinois
Chicago Cubs players
Clinton Cubs players
Des Moines Bruins players
Grand Rapids Jets players
Macon Peaches players
Major League Baseball pitchers
Nashville Vols players
Shreveport Sports players
Union City Greyhounds players
People from Rock Falls, Illinois